Big Salmon River may refer to the following rivers in Canada:

Big Salmon River (New Brunswick)
Big Salmon River (Yukon)